In algebraic geometry, a toric variety or torus embedding is an algebraic variety containing an algebraic torus as an open dense subset, such that the action of the torus on itself extends to the whole variety. Some authors also require it to be normal. Toric varieties form an important and rich class of examples in algebraic geometry, which often provide a testing ground for theorems. The geometry of a toric variety is fully determined by the combinatorics of its associated fan, which often makes computations far more tractable. For a certain special, but still quite general class of toric varieties, this information is also encoded in a polytope, which creates a powerful connection of the subject with convex geometry. Familiar examples of toric varieties are affine space, projective spaces, products of projective spaces and bundles over projective space.

Toric varieties from tori

The original motivation to study toric varieties was to study torus embeddings. Given the algebraic torus T, the group of characters Hom(T,Cx) forms a lattice. Given a collection of points A, a subset of this lattice, each point determines a map to C and thus the collection determines a map to C|A|. By taking the Zariski closure of the image of such a map, one obtains an affine variety. If the collection of lattice points A generates the character lattice, this variety is a torus embedding. In similar fashion one may produce a parametrized projective toric variety, by taking the projective closure of the above map, viewing it as a map into an affine patch of projective space. 

Given a projective toric variety, observe that we may probe its geometry by one-parameter subgroups. Each one parameter subgroup, determined by a point in the lattice, dual to the character lattice, is a punctured curve inside the projective toric variety. Since the variety is compact, this punctured curve has a unique limit point. Thus, by partitioning the one-parameter subgroup lattice by the limit points of punctured curves, we obtain a lattice fan, a collection of polyhedral rational cones. The cones of highest dimension correspond precisely to the torus fixed points, the limits of these punctured curves.

The toric variety of a fan

Suppose that N is a finite-rank free abelian group.  A strongly convex rational polyhedral cone in N is a convex cone (of the real vector space of N) with apex at the origin, generated by a finite number of vectors of N, that contains no line through the origin.  These will be called "cones" for short.

For each cone σ its affine toric variety Uσ is the spectrum of the semigroup algebra of the dual cone.

A fan is a collection of cones closed under taking intersections and faces.

The toric variety of a fan is given by taking the affine toric varieties of its cones and gluing them together by identifying Uσ with an open subvariety of Uτ whenever σ is a face of τ. Conversely, every fan of strongly convex rational cones has an associated toric variety.

The fan associated with a toric variety condenses some important data about the variety. For example, a variety is smooth if every cone in its fan can be generated by a subset of a basis for the free abelian group N.

Morphisms of toric varieties

Suppose that Δ1 and Δ2 are fans in lattices N1 and N2. If f is a linear map from N1 to N2 such that the image of every cone of Δ1 is contained in a cone of Δ2, then f induces a morphism f* between the corresponding toric varieties. This map f* is proper if and only if the preimage of |Δ2| under the map f is |Δ1|, where |Δ| is the underlying space of a fan Δ given by the union of its cones.

Resolution of singularities

A toric variety is nonsingular if its cones of maximal dimension are generated by a basis of the lattice.
This implies that every toric variety has a resolution of singularities given by another toric variety, which can be constructed by subdividing the maximal cones into cones of nonsingular toric varieties.

The toric variety of a convex polytope
The fan of a rational convex polytope in N consists of the cones over its proper faces. The toric variety of the polytope is the toric variety of its fan. A variation of this construction is to take a rational polytope in the dual of N and take the toric variety of its polar set in N.

The toric variety has a map to the polytope in the dual of N whose fibers are topological tori.  For example, the complex projective plane CP2 may be represented by three complex coordinates satisfying

where the sum has been chosen to account for the real rescaling part of the projective map, and the coordinates must be moreover identified by the following U(1) action:

The approach of toric geometry is to write

The coordinates  are non-negative, and they parameterize a triangle because

that is,

The triangle is the toric base of the complex projective plane.

The precise orientation of the circles within the torus is usually depicted by the slope of the line intervals (the sides of the triangle, in this case).

Relation to mirror symmetry 
The idea of toric varieties is useful for mirror symmetry because an interpretation of certain data of a fan as data of a polytope leads to a geometric construction of mirror manifolds.

References

External links
 Home page of D. A. Cox, with several lectures on toric varieties

See also 
Gordan's lemma
Toric ideal
Toric stack (roughly this is obtained by replacing the step of taking a GIT quotient by a quotient stack)
Toroidal embedding

Algebraic geometry